"Listening for the Weather" is a song by New Zealand singer Bic Runga. It was released in April 2003 as the third single from her second studio album, Beautiful Collision (2002). Upon its release, it reached number 14 on the New Zealand Singles Chart, becoming her most recent top-20 hit in her home country. The Recording Industry Association of New Zealand (now Recorded Music NZ) ranked "Listening for the Weather" as the 36th-most-successful single of New Zealand during 2003.

Track listing
New Zealand CD single
 "Listening for the Weather"
 "Counting the Days" (live)
 "The Be All and End All" (live)

Charts

Weekly charts

Year-end charts

References

External links
 Bic's official website

2002 songs
2003 singles
Bic Runga songs
Columbia Records singles
Songs written by Bic Runga